Neogontscharovia is a genus of flowering plants belonging to the family Plumbaginaceae.

It is native to Afghanistan and Tadzhikistan.

The genus name of Neogontscharovia is in honour of Nikolái Goncharov (1900–1942), a Russian botanist and plant collector. 

It was first described and published in Bot. Zhurn. (Moscow & Leningrad) Vol.56 on page 1633 in 1971.

Known species
According to Kew:
Neogontscharovia mira 
Neogontscharovia miranda 
Neogontscharovia saxifragifolia

References

Plumbaginaceae
Caryophyllales genera
Plants described in 1971
Flora of Afghanistan
Flora of Tajikistan